Jean Dupuy may refer to:
Jean Dupuy (artist) (1925–2021), French artist
Jean Dupuy (politician) (1844–1919), French politician and media baron
Jean Dupuy (rugby union) (1934–2010), French rugby player
Jean Dupuy (French Resistance) (1911–1944)